St Peter's Pool is a bay in the East Mainland of Orkney, Scotland.  This bay was the site of significant coastal defences during World War II, when a German invasion was anticipated.

References

Bays of Orkney